Epidesma aurimacula is a moth of the subfamily Arctiinae. It was described by William Schaus in 1905. It is found in Venezuela.

References

Epidesma
Moths described in 1905